The Wisconsin Valley Library Service (WVLS) is a library system made up of 25 public libraries and hundreds of non-public libraries across seven counties in north-central Wisconsin. These include the counties of Clark, Forest, Langlade, Lincoln, Marathon, Oneida, and Taylor. The WVLS offices are located in the headquarters of the Marathon County Public Library in Wausau, Wisconsin.

Overview 
The Wisconsin Valley Library Service is one of 15 library systems in Wisconsin. It provides library services to residents of the system area, such as interlibrary loan and reference referrals, in-service training programs, and professional advisory services.

Administration 
WVLS operates under Chapter 43 of the Wisconsin State Statutes and is governed by a 15-member Board of Trustees. Each participating county has at least one member on the board. The remainder are allocated according to population. Trustees are appointed by the Chairs of the County Boards of Supervisors.

WVLS member public libraries 
The following public libraries are currently members of WVLS:
Marathon County Public Library, headquartered in Wausau, Marathon County
Abbotsford Public Library in Abbotsford, Clark County
Antigo Public Library, headquartered in Antigo, Langlade County
Colby Community Library in Colby, Clark County
Crandon Public Library in Crandon, Forest County
Dorchester Public Library in Dorchester, Clark County
Western Taylor County Public Library in Gilman, Taylor County
Granton Community Library in Granton, Clark County
Greenwood Public Library in Greenwood, Clark County
Edith B. Evans Memorial Library in Laona, Forest County
Loyal Public Library in Loyal, Clark County
Frances L. Simek Memorial Library in Medford, Taylor County
T.B. Scott Free Library in Merrill, Lincoln County
Minocqua Public Library in Minocqua, Oneida County
Neillsville Public Library in Neillsville, Clark County
Owen Public Library in Owen, Clark County
Rhinelander District Library in Rhinelander, Oneida County
Rib Lake Public Library in Rib Lake, Taylor County
Jean M. Thomsen Memorial Library in Stetsonville, Taylor County
Thorp Public Library in Thorp, Clark County
Edward U. Demmer Memorial Library in Three Lakes, Oneida County
Tomahawk Public Library in Tomahawk, Lincoln County
Wabeno Public Library in Wabeno, Forest County
Westboro Public Library in Westboro, Taylor County
Withee Public Library in Withee, Clark County

References

External links
Wisconsin Valley Library Service
Marathon County Public Library

Libraries in Wisconsin
Library consortia in Wisconsin
Education in Marathon County, Wisconsin
Education in Clark County, Wisconsin
Education in Langlade County, Wisconsin
Education in Lincoln County, Wisconsin
Education in Oneida County, Wisconsin
Education in Taylor County, Wisconsin